Pundhe is a small village in Shahapur taluka of Thane district,  Maharashtra, India. It is situated on Mumbai Nashik Express Way. It is a Historical Place having Pandav Leni.
Pundhe is also an Industrial complex. Atgaon Is nearest (2 km) railway station of central railway. Pundhe is 5 km far from Shahapur and 6 km far from Asangaon railway station.

Villages in Thane district